Lorenzo Ariaudo (born 11 June 1989) is an Italian footballer who plays as a centre back for  club Novara.

Club career
Ariaudo joined Juventus as a nine-year-old and was part of the 2009 Torneo di Viareggio-winning team. He made his first team debut in Juventus's 1–1 draw with Artmedia Petržalka in the second leg of the 2008–09 UEFA Champions League third qualifying round, in which Juventus won 5–1 on aggregate to advance to the group stages, and was awarded a five-year professional contract. He made Serie A debut on 18 January 2009 against Lazio in Rome on a match that ended with a 1–1 draw. Although he was not able to break into the first team permanently that season, then-manager Ciro Ferrara described Ariaudo as a future prospect.

After being included in pre-season friendlies, Ariaudo was promoted to the first team permanently. On 2 January 2010, he was sent on loan to Cagliari for €500,000. After being on the bench for a string of games, he finally made his debut for the Sardinian club on 21 February as a starter and helped keep a clean sheet in a 2–0 win over Parma.

In June 2010, Cagliari excised the rights to purchase him in co-ownership deal for €1.3million. On 31 January 2011, the club purchased him outright, as part of the deal of Alessandro Matri's €2.5million loan.

On 4 January 2014, Ariaudo left Cagliari for Serie A side Sassuolo for €800,000 transfer fee, signing a -year contract.

On 30 January 2015 Ariaudo signed a loan deal with Genoa C.F.C.

In January 2016 he was signed by Empoli.

On 25 February 2022, Ariaudo signed with Alessandria until the end of the season.

On 13 January 2023, Ariaudo joined Novara.

International career
On 25 March 2009 Ariaudo made his debut for the Italy Under-21 squad and marked it with a goal in the friendly game against Austria that ended with a 2–2 draw.
 He was named in the preliminary squad for the 2009 European Championships but did not make the final 23-man squad. Since then, he has become a regular starter for the Azzurrini in their 2011 European Championship qualifying campaign, playing the full 90 minutes in four of the last five matches since March.

Career statistics

References

External links

National Team Statistics on FIGC official website
Profile on Lega Serie A website

1989 births
Living people
Footballers from Turin
Italian footballers
Italy under-21 international footballers
Association football defenders
Juventus F.C. players
Cagliari Calcio players
U.S. Sassuolo Calcio players
Genoa C.F.C. players
Empoli F.C. players
Frosinone Calcio players
U.S. Alessandria Calcio 1912 players
Novara F.C. players
Serie A players
Serie B players
Serie C players